The Borgward B 3000 was a medium-sized truck made by German manufacturer Carl F. W. Borgward GmbH between 1941 and 1944 in the Bremen-Sebaldsbrück works. After World War II, B 3000 production continued from July 1948 to 1950. There was also an electric version named Borgward BE3000.

Einheits-Lkw 3 t
Borgward started building trucks in 1937, supplying vehicles of up to five tons of payload until the start of the Second World War in 1939, including the 3-ton Borgward G. W. truck, available with petrol or Diesel engine.

A large contingent of these trucks was requisitioned by the Wehrmacht. Initially, production of the regular truck range continued. In 1940, the German truck manufacturers were directed to curtail the number of different models in order to focus on the production of simplified 'standard' trucks with a payload of around three tons.

As of 1942, production of the successor commenced. This new "Einheits-LKW" ("standard truck") was a 3-ton truck with the official designation Borgward B 3000 S/O (with a 3.7 litre, 78 hp petrol engine) or Borgward B 3000 S/D respectively (with a  5-litre, 75 hp diesel engine, both with six cylinders). To save raw materials, the trucks were later simplified even further by measures like dropping the diamond-shaped Borgward badge on the grille or replacing the steel cabin with a standard wooden truck cabin ("Einheitsführerhaus").

The B 3000 was an adequate vehicle, but the lighter Opel 'Blitz' V 3000 proved superior.

Production volume 

Borgward produced other military vehicles besides trucks, especially the  Sd.Kfz. 7 half-track, the Sd.Kfz. 251 armoured half-track and the Borgward IV carrier.

In all, about 30,000 3-ton trucks were built until the plant was destroyed  by Allied bombing raids in 1944, with forced labour used in 1944. Plans to recommence production in order to build the Opel Blitz in Bremen could not be implemented when Bremen was conquered by British troops in 1945.

Notes

References
 Reinhard Frank: Lastkraftwagen der Wehrmacht. Nebel-Verlag, Utting .
 Peter Kurze: Liefer- und Lastwagen aus Bremen: Nutzfahrzeuge seit 1945 von Borgward, Hanomag und Mercedes. Kurze-Verlag 2005, .
 Oswald, Werner: Kraftfahrzeuge und Panzer der Reichswehr, Wehrmacht und Bundeswehr. Motorbuch Verlag, Stuttgart 1982.

External links 
 Pictures, March 19, 2012
 Wehrmacht vehicles,  March 19, 2012 (in German)
 surviving Borgward B 3000, March 19, 2012

Borgward B 3000
B 3000
World War II vehicles of Germany
Military vehicles introduced in the 1930s
Military vehicles of Germany